Robert Kilderry (born 6 June 1941) is a former Australian amateur tennis player. He reached the third round of the 1962 Australian Championships in the men's singles. He is the father of Paul Kilderry.

References

External links 
 

Australian male tennis players
Living people
1941 births
Place of birth missing (living people)